Rendcomb College is a public school (English private boarding and day school) for pupils aged 13–18), located in the village of Rendcomb five miles north of Cirencester in Gloucestershire, England.

Rendcomb College was founded in 1920 by Frederick Noel Hamilton Wills (Noel Wills). The School has benefited from the stewardship of the Wills family for almost a century and from the two-tiered Governance of Trustees and Governing Body.

History

In 1918, Noel Wills bought Rendcomb Park with a view to forming a ‘Transition School’ to provide a free boarding education to about forty boys from the elementary schools of Gloucestershire and prepare them for entry to public school.  He envisaged that by giving them ‘the best possible education, some would gain entry by scholarship to public schools and perhaps, a few ultimately to University.  This initial vision was broad and generous, involving supplements from the endowment to subsidise scholarships and leaving scholarships for those who could not secure entry to public schools for ‘assistance in beginning professions and trades’.

On 2 June 1920 Rendcomb College opened with twelve boys, James Herbert Simpson (formerly a House Master at Rugby School) at the helm as Headmaster and Noel Wills as Chair of Governors.  The two men shaped the path of the School for a little over seven years and their relationship was founded on mutual respect and affection.

Headmasters

Buildings and grounds

Rendcomb Park was established in 1544 and by 1676 held 250 acres. In 1086, two estates at Rendcomb were owned by Gilbert, son of Turold. Five hides had formerly belonged to Aluric and three to Walter, his son-in-law. These estates passed to the Earls of Gloucester by the late 12th century, and were subsequently sub-let to the De La Mare family. In 1255, Earl Richard de Clare reserved two plowlands for himself; that land became Rendcomb manor. From 1387 until 1503 the manor was held by Thomas and Robert De La Mare and their descendants. In 1503, Edmund Tame of Fairford obtained it and by marriage it passed to the Staffords in 1547. Richard Berkeley of Stoke Gifford obtained it in 1564. The Guises purchased it in 1635 but a Berkeley continued to live there until after 1661. During the period when the Berkeley family held it, Elizabeth I visited in 1592. Sir Thomas Roe lived at Rendcomb during the time his mother Dame Eleanor Berkeley owned the Manor (1608). As a rule, the Berkeley family were only visitors. The De La Mares and the Tames lived at the manor. The Guises built a new house there.

The original college buildings consist of a large mansion built in 1865 by Sir Francis Goldsmid of the Goldsmid family (presumably d'Avigdor-Goldsmid) and designed by the well-known architect Philip Hardwick; the Stable Block (which is now the centre for Science, Maths, Languages, ICT and Geography teaching in the college) and the Old Rectory.

A new wing was added to the main building in 1968 to provide Sixth Form Study bedrooms which subsequently evolved into the Junior part of the School in 2000 for pupils aged 3–11.  In September 1966 the Old Rectory was opened as a boarding house for younger boys, after major alterations and additions and it still serves that purpose today. In September 1967 a new Arts Block was opened. It now contains a Design studio, Art rooms, a photography room, a craft room and kiln, Music teaching rooms, and several practice rooms as well as a music technology room.  In 1973, a purpose-built Sixth Form House was added to the School to facilitate the introduction of girls to the Sixth Form at Rendcomb, at the time an innovative move for a boys’ boarding School.  In 1982, Prince and Princess Michael of Kent officially opened The Dulverton Hall, an assembly, concert and performance space recognising the many benefactions of Lord Dulverton and his Trust. Godman House, named after Colonel John Godman who was Rendcomb's Chair of Governors for 35 years, followed a year later and is now a Girls’ Boarding House for the younger age group.  Lawn and Stable Houses were formally opened by the Duke of Gloucester in December 1989 and these houses now accommodate middle and senior boys and girls, respectively.  The trustees gave the college use of a house in the village ~ number 20 ~ to use for students in their final year, who live together in small groups for a week at a time managing budgets, meals (and laundry!) in preparation for University life.  The college continues to maintain and develop its site; all of the boarding houses have been refurbished within the last three years.  In October 2014 Rendcomb College was granted planning permission by Cotswold District Council for a multi-purpose Performing Arts Centre.

At the heart of the School site is the Parish church, St Peter's, which dates back to the 12th century, though much of the current structure reflects a 16th-century rebuilding. The church has been described as being "of extreme interest to the student and amateur of the Perpendicular". The 12th century font in the church is widely regarded as one of the finest remaining Norman works in Britain.

The college owns some 230 acres of land including the Park (part of which is a deer park listed in the Doomsday record) through which the River Churn flows from a lake near the northern boundary. 100 feet above the college, at a point from which a view is obtained, ten acres of the park contain sports pitches and a recently refurbished pavilion. A heated open-air swimming pool lies next to the college buildings, presented in 1961 by the Dulverton Trust and Major David Wills. Two hard tennis courts were presented to the college by Major David Wills in 1963; squash courts were added to the site in 1970 and a sports hall and climbing wall in 1979. A gift of meadow-land (‘Landage’) from Major Tom Wills was converted first into The Sinclair Field (after Mrs Huntley Sinclair, the wife of the Founder who remained a Governor and benefactor of Rendcomb for a span of 60 years) and then into an all weather surface in 1997 in memory of Martin Wills, trustee of the college from 1983 to 1992.

In 2015 new tennis courts were opened behind the all weather sports surface to make way for the new Griffin Centre – a Performing Arts Centre. The Griffin Centre opened in 2016 and included a 350-seat auditorium, mirrored dance studio with ballet bars, drama theory classroom, dressing rooms and a prop and set workshop.

Public benefit

Rendcomb College was founded to give students (boys as then was the case) from modest backgrounds a broad-ranging education in an inspirational setting.  Boys who entered the School were either Gloucestershire Foundation Scholars (who were required to have attended for no fewer than two years one of the elementary schools in the county) – or Nominated Foundation Scholars – who were either at or would soon be at Preparatory Schools – and paid no fees.  It was not until 1923 that the third class of entrants – fee-payers – was admitted.  A History of Rendcomb College (1976) describes seven characteristics of the School nurtured by Simpson and Wills; the first and most important of these is ‘The Social Mixture’ – "Rendcomb's most unusual feature. Old boys describe it as the School's ‘greatest strength’ and Simpson's ‘greatest success'"
In many respects, Rendcomb pioneered the pattern of bursary provision that many large independent Schools are currently trying to emulate, initiating a social-mixture at the School twenty years before the Fleming Report on Public Schools (1944) and more than forty years before the 1965 appointment of The Public School Commission to advise the Government ‘on the best way of integrating the public schools with the State system of education’.

Rendcomb's links with the State System in the county was also pioneering and unusual.  As early as 1922, a small grant of £120 p.a. was made to the college by the Gloucestershire Education Committee as a token of appreciation for the college's services to the county.  One of the founding Governors, Canon Sewell, who was later to become chairman, was fundamental in maintaining strong relationships with the County Education Committee aided ably by Colonel Godman; these two men secured the future of the Gloucestershire Foundation Scholarships which benefited 67 pupils from (1920–1934) and 260 pupils (from 1934 to 1978).  Other Scholarships and Awards were given and on average, 33% of Rendcomb's students from 1934 to 1978 each year received significant financial assistance. Gloucestershire Foundation places continued to be given until the late 1980s though complete records for this period were not kept. In 1970, to celebrate the fiftieth anniversary of the School, a new Scholarship – The Noel Wills Scholarship – was bequeathed to pay full fees for a student from a Gloucestershire Primary School to attend Rendcomb.

Notable former pupils

Kojo Annan, son of UN Secretary-General Kofi Annan; while at Rendcomb, he was a successful rugby player
 Richard Dunwoody, retired National Hunt racing jockey
David Mabberley, Keeper of the Herbarium, Library, Art and Archives at the Royal Botanic Gardens, Kew, ex-Director of the Center for Urban Horticulture at the University of Washington in Seattle, president of the IAPT, ex-Dean of Wadham College, Oxford
John Middleton Murry, Jr., writer who used the names Colin Murry and Richard Cowper
 Angus Primrose, yacht designer
 David Tyler, businessman, Chairman of Sainsbury's
 David Vaisey, historian and archivist, formerly Bodley's Librarian at the University of Oxford, 1986–96, now Librarian Emeritus
Nicolas Walter, anarchist and atheist writer, speaker and activist
Nicholas Wapshott, journalist and writer, expert on Keynes and Hayek

References

External links

Rendcomb College homepage
The Old Rendcombian Web Site – Alumni web site 
Profile at the ISC website

Boarding schools in Gloucestershire
Private schools in Gloucestershire
Educational institutions established in 1920
1920 establishments in England
Country houses in Gloucestershire
Grade II* listed houses
Grade II* listed buildings in Gloucestershire
Member schools of the Headmasters' and Headmistresses' Conference
Cirencester